Mirage is the second studio album from the I've Sound singer, Mell, released on October 27, 2010. The album contains eight new songs, one old song from an album released on Comic Market away back 2002, Infection Which was used in an episode of the hit anime series Highschool of the Dead, and a remix of her famous song Red Fraction which was used as an opening theme for the OVA of the anime series Black Lagoon. 
This album will contain her three singles Proof/No Vain, Kill and Rideback.

The album will come in a limited CD+DVD edition (GNCV-1023) and a regular CD-only edition (GNCV-1024). The DVD will contain the PV for the title track "Mirage" and the making for her activity report for the year 2010.

Track listing

CD
mirage – 5:27
Composition/Arrangement: Kazuya Takase
Lyrics: MELL
KILL – 4:53
Composition/Arrangement: Kazuya Takase
Lyrics: MELL
Princess bloom – 4:51
Composition/Arrangement: Ken Morioka
Lyrics: MELL
Fascination – 4:59
Composition: Tomoyuki Nakazawa
Arrangement: Tomoyuki Nakazawa, Takeshi Ozaki
Lyrics: MELL
FIXER – 4:56
Composition/Arrangement: Kazuya Takase
Lyrics: MELL
 – 5:55
Composition/Arrangement: C.G mix
Lyrics: MELL
Proof – 5:33
Composition/Arrangement: Kazuya Takase
Lyrics: MELL
Teleportation guy – 5:54
Composition/Arrangement: Ken Morioka
Lyrics: MELL
Love illusion – 5:01
Composition: C.G mix
Arrangement: C.G mix, Takeshi Ozaki
Lyrics: MELL
Infection – 4:24
Composition/Arrangement: Maiko Iuchi
Lyrics: MELL, seven-lon
Rideback – 4:42
Composition/Arrangement: Kazuya Takase
Lyrics: MELL
MY PRECIOUS – 7:48
Composition/Arrangement: Ken Morioka
Lyrics: MELL
Red Fraction -IO drive mix- – 5:00
Composition/Arrangement: Kazuya Takase
Lyrics: MELL

Track listing

DVD
Mirage (PV)
Making Of Activity Report 2010

References

2010 albums
Mell albums